Dearne Community & Miners Welfare F.C. was an English association football club from Goldthorpe, South Yorkshire. The club competed in the FA Amateur Cup in 1947, and won the Hatchard League in 1958 and 1959

References

Defunct football clubs in England
Defunct football clubs in South Yorkshire
Sheffield Association League
Barnsley Association League
Hatchard League
Doncaster & District Senior League
Mining association football teams in England